Aurora and Cephalus is a 1733 oil-on-canvas painting by François Boucher, signed by the artist and now in the Musée des Beaux-Arts de Nancy. It shows Cephalus and Aurora (the Roman form of Eos) from Book VII of Ovid's Metamorphoses.

History
Boucher produced it after his return from Italy and it was commissioned by François Derbais, advocate to the Parliament of Paris, for his hôtel particulier on rue de la Poissonnière in Paris, as a pendant to Venus Asking Vulcan for Weapons for Aeneas (1732, Louvre). Derbais' descendants sold both works, which came back on the market together in the posthumous sale of Watelet's collection on 12 June 1786. They were bought by Paillet for the French royal collection in the Louvre for 3121 livres.

In 1801, while the Louvre was known as the Central Museum of Arts, Aurora and Cephalus was one of thirty works it selected to decorate the Château de Lunéville for the signing of the Treaty of Lunéville between France and Austria. At the request of the Meurthe département the Boucher and twelve other paintings were permanently placed in the museum at Nancy even before the passing of the décret Chaptal on 1 September 1801, seen as the foundation date for France's regional museums.

Display history

Nancy
Art français au temps de Stanislas, June–September 1955
De l'an II au sacre de Napoléon. Le premier musée de Nancy, 23 November 2001 – 4 March 2002

Elsewhere
 Trois siècles de peinture française. XVIe – XVIIIe. Geneva, Musée Rath, 1 July – 16 October 1949
La femme dans l'art français. Bruxelles, Palais des Beaux-Arts, March–May 1953
Masterpieces of french painting through five centuries (1400–1900). New Orleans, Isaac Delgado Museum of Art, 17 October 1953 – 10 January 1954
European masters of the eighteenth century. London, Royal Academy of Arts, winter exhibition 1954–55
Chefs-d’œuvre du Musée de Nancy. Liège, Musée des Beaux-Arts, 24 December 1964 – 24 January 1965
De Watteau à David. Peintures et dessins des musées de province français. Bruxelles, Palais des Beaux-Arts, 27 September – 30 November 1975
François Boucher. 1703 – 1770. New York, The Metropolitan Museum of Art, 17 February – 4 May 1986
De Tintoret à Manet. Chefs d’œuvre du Musée des Beaux-Arts de Nancy. Japan, 1994
De Barocci a Modigliani. Le collezioni del Musée des Beaux-Arts di Nancy. Parma, Palazzo Ducale di Colorno, 1 March – 1 June 1997

See also
 Eos, a 1895 painting by Evelyn De Morgan which depicts the Greek equivalent of Aurora, Eos

References

1733 paintings
Mythological paintings by François Boucher
Paintings in the Museum of Fine Arts of Nancy
Paintings of Greek goddesses
Paintings based on Metamorphoses
Aurora (mythology)